Mitchell J. Silver (born June 27, 1960) is the former commissioner for the New York City Parks Department. Appointed by Mayor Bill de Blasio, he assumed office May 2014, and led the department until his resignation in July 2021. He was president of the American Planning Association (APA) between 2011 and 2013, the first African American to hold the title.

Education 
Silver attended Midwood High School in Brooklyn. He has a bachelor's degree in Architecture from Pratt Institute and a Master of Urban Planning from Hunter College. He is certified by the American Institute of Certified Planners (AICP) and a licensed Professional Planner (PP) in the State of New Jersey.

Career 
He held roles as a policy and planning director for the Manhattan Borough President's office, a city planner for the New York City Department of Planning, a principal of a New York City-based planning firm, a town manager in New Jersey, and deputy planning director in Washington, D.C.

He served as chief Planning and Development Officer and Planning Director for the City of Raleigh, North Carolina previous to his NYC Parks Department position. He was president of the American Planning Association (APA) between 2011 and 2013, the first African American to hold the title.

In Raleigh, Silver directed a staff of 230 employees in the Departments of City Planning, Community Development and Inspections, in addition to four offices: Transportation Planning, Economic Development, Development Services, and the City's Urban Design Center. He served on the City's Executive Leadership team with the City Manager, Assistant City Managers, CFO and CIO. Silver led the comprehensive plan update process in Raleigh and oversaw a rewrite of the Development Code.

As president of APA, he led an international effort to elevate the value and rebirth of planning in the 21st century.

In 2015, he told the New York Times that Brooklyn Bridge Park was one of his favorite city parks.

New York City Parks Commissioner 
Mayor Bill de Blasio named Silver the New York City's Parks Commissioner in 2014. At the time, the Mayor said:  "He has a passion for fairness and equality, and he brings it to the work of government, and understands that we have to ensure that parks and open spaces are available in every community, and are well-maintained in every community in this city." The New York Times wrote that "Mr. Silver’s selection suggests that the mayor plans to confront the issue of inequality in the city’s parks."

In 2017, Silver appointed Marty Maher to the position of Brooklyn Parks Commissioner.

Teaching and honors
He has taught graduate planning courses at Harvard Graduate School of Design, Hunter College, Brooklyn College, Pratt Institute, and North Carolina State University. Silver lectures throughout the United States and abroad on a variety of planning topics. He is a contributing author and editor of the International City/County Management Association (ICMA) latest edition of "Local Planning: Contemporary Principles and Practice," which is a resource for local governments engaged in planning.

In 2012, the Urban Times named him s top international thought leaders of the built environment today. The next year, UBM Future Cities named Silver as one of the top 100 City Innovators in the world and the Royal Town Planning Institute made him an honorary lifetime member. In 2014, he was inducted into the College of Fellows of the American Planning Association.

In 2016, Silver was elected a Fellow of the UK's Academy of Social Sciences (FAcSS).

In 2017, Silver was selected to become an Honorary American Society of Landscape Architects (ASLA) Member.

Personal life
He is married to Mary, an administrator for the nonprofit Brooklyn Community Services, and they have a daughter. They live in downtown Brooklyn in apartment building with panoramic views and a fitness center on its first floor and like to go to Union Square in Manhattan. He is a confessed "social media addict," and as of 2015, a frequenter of Starbucks.

References

Living people
American urban planners
Commissioners in New York City
Pratt Institute alumni
Hunter College alumni
African-American architects
American architects
New York City Department of Parks and Recreation
Fellows of the Academy of Social Sciences
Brooklyn College faculty
21st-century African-American people
1960 births
20th-century African-American people